Dick Tracy Meets Gruesome (also known as Dick Tracy Meets Karloff and Dick Tracy's Amazing Adventure (UK) ) is a 1947 thriller film starring Boris Karloff, Ralph Byrd, and Anne Gwynne. The film is the fourth and final installment of the Dick Tracy film series released by RKO Radio Pictures.

Plot
Just out of jail, Gruesome (Boris Karloff) goes to the Hangman's Knot saloon, where his old crime crony, Melody (Tony Barrett), is now playing piano. Gruesome takes him to a plastics manufacturer, where X-Ray (Skelton Knaggs) and a mysterious mastermind are in possession of a secret formula and hatching a sinister plot.

Ignoring a warning not to touch anything, Gruesome sniffs the gas from a mysterious test tube; he escapes the toxic fumes but collapses upon returning to the Hangman's Knot and is taken to the city morgue, where his body stiffens dramatically.

Dick Tracy (Ralph Byrd) is at headquarters speaking with college professor Dr. A. Tomic (Milton Parsons), a scientist who suspects someone has been following him. At the morgue, Tracy's sidekick Pat (Lyle Latell) has his back turned when Gruesome wakes up and knocks him out. Pat describes him to Tracy as looking a lot like the actor Boris Karloff (a gag cribbed from Arsenic and Old Lace).

At a bank where Tess Trueheart (Anne Gwynne) happens to be, Gruesome and Melody drop a grenade with the gas into a wastebasket; when it goes off, everyone but Tess freezes in place. They rob the place of more than $100,000 and shoot a cop on the sidewalk before Tracy and his men arrive. Gruesome demands half of the loot from X-Ray .... or else.

Tracy tries to learn the secret of the formula from Dr. Tomic's top assistant, Professor Learned (June Clayworth), before going after Gruesome and his gang. Over the course of the film, Learned is shot dead, and Melody dies in a car accident. As an offhand comment, Tess quips "dead men tell no tales", which gives Tracy an idea: since Gruesome will resort even to murder to keep his secret weapon a secret, if he thinks Melody is alive, he will hunt Melody down to prevent any leaks. Tracy decides to run a false flag operation: put out word that Melody has been captured alive, and pose as Melody hoping Gruesome will show up. Gruesome takes the bait and abducts what he thinks is Melody from the hospital. In a climactic shootout at the plastic factory, Tracy shoots Gruesome in the back.

Tracy retrieves one last gas grenade with the intent of analyzing the contents. Back at the office, in the closing scene, the grenade inadvertently goes off, freezing everyone in place just as Dick and Tess are about to kiss.

Cast
 Boris Karloff as Gruesome – A corpse-like gangster.
 Ralph Byrd as Dick Tracy – The tough, square-jawed detective
 Anne Gwynne as Tess Truehart – Tracy's girlfriend, who witnesses the bank robbery
 Skelton Knaggs as Rudolph X-Ray – Gruesome's spectacled henchman
 Edward Ashley as Dr. Lee Thal –  an interested party.
 June Clayworth as Dr. I.M. Learned – Prof. Tomic's assistant
 Lyle Latell as Pat Patton – Tracy's bumbling sidekick
 Tony Barrett as 'Melody' Fiske – A greedy, piano-playing thug
 James Nolan as Dan Sterne – A nosy newspaper reporter
 Joseph Crehan as Chief Brandon – Tracy's reliable boss
 Milton Parsons as Dr. A. Tomic – a State U. physicist

Legacy
 In 2007, Dick Tracy Meets Gruesome was shown on the horror hosted television series Cinema Insomnia. Apprehensive Films later released the Cinema Insomnia episode onto DVD.
 On October 16, 2014, writer Mike Curtis and artist Joe Staton introduced a version of the Gruesome character into the Dick Tracy comic strip.  They introduced a character inspired by Melody (Mel O. Dee) on October 27 of that year.  The cartoonists carry the joke further. Gruesome had had plastic surgery done to change his appearance, by a Dr. Einstein and Gruesome gets drafted to portray Jonathon Brewster in a production of Arsenic and Old Lace.
 US band Poet Named Revolver, from Nashville, Tennessee, released an album called Meets Gruesome. Recorded in 2007, first released in 2008, and reissued in 2014 by No Kings Record Cadre, with visual references to the film.

References

External links

 
 
 
 
 

1947 films
American black-and-white films
Films directed by John Rawlins
Dick Tracy films
Films about organized crime in the United States
RKO Pictures films
1940s police procedural films
American thriller films
1940s thriller films
Films scored by Paul Sawtell
1940s American films